El amor y la ciudad is a 2006 Argentine romantic drama film written and directed by María Teresa Costantini. It premiered at the Mar del Plata International Film Festival in Argentina on 10 March 2006.

The film was also shown at the 2006 Shanghai Film Festival, and the Rio de Janeiro International Film Festival.

Cast
 Adrián Navarro
 Patrick Bauchau
 Vera Carnevale
 María Teresa Costantini
 Jean Pierre Noher
 José Palomino Cortez
 Jean Pierre Reguerraz

References

External links
 

2006 films
2000s Spanish-language films
2006 romantic drama films
Argentine romantic drama films
2000s Argentine films